Aleksandar Gruber (Serbian Cyrillic: Александар Гpубep; born February 3, 1974) is a former Serbian football player. He currently works as a football team manager.

Career
After starting playing with FK Sinđelić Beograd, he gained experience in the three seasons he solidly played with FK Radnički Pirot. They made him earn a move to a Belgrade-based club FK Zvezdara that, at time, was seeking promotion to the First League of FR Yugoslavia, which he would eventually reach. He played there between 1998 and 2001 with a short six months spell in between with Polish Lech Poznań in 1999. In 2001, he played in Belorussian top league club FC Slavia Mozyr. In January 2002, he returned to Serbia, this time to play the rest of the season with FK Vojvodina. The following season started with him playing for FK Rudar Pljevlja before returning, in January 2003, to his well-known club FK Radnički Pirot. After playing two years in lower Serbian leagues with them, in summer 2004, he  decided to move abroad again, this time to Latvian club FK Ventspils with whom he won two national cups in the two seasons he played there before retiring in 2006.

References

External links
 

Living people
1974 births
Serbian footballers
Association football midfielders
Serbian expatriate footballers
Expatriate footballers in Poland
Expatriate footballers in Belarus
Expatriate footballers in Latvia
Serbian expatriate sportspeople in Latvia
Serbian expatriate sportspeople in Poland
FK Sinđelić Beograd players
FK Radnički Pirot players
FK Zvezdara players
Lech Poznań players
FC Slavia Mozyr players
FK Vojvodina players
FK Rudar Pljevlja players
FK Ventspils players
Serbian football managers